
Księginice Wielkie  is a village in the administrative district of Gmina Kondratowice, within Strzelin County, Lower Silesian Voivodeship, in south-western Poland. Prior to 1945 it was in Germany.

People 
 Johann Adam Steinmetz

References

External links
Homepage 

Villages in Strzelin County